3C 285 is a radio galaxy located in the constellation Canes Venatici.

References

External links
 www.jb.man.ac.uk/atlas/

Radio galaxies
Canes Venatici
285
42.37
46625